Viewlands House is an historic building in the Viewlands area immediately to the west of the centre of Perth, Perth and Kinross, Scotland. Located on Viewlands Road, it is a Category B listed building, built around 1840. One of its main features is its Ionic order-columned porch with balustraded parapet. A twelve-room extension was added in 1997, bringing the building's total up to 32.

Formerly a training college for Perth-based General Accident Assurance Corporation, it is now an Abbeyfield retirement home.

See also
List of listed buildings in Perth, Scotland

References

External links
Perth, 25 Viewlands Road, Viewlands House – Canmore
View of the building from Viewlands Road – Google Street View, August 2009

1840 establishments in Scotland
Listed buildings in Perth, Scotland
Category B listed buildings in Perth and Kinross